This is a list of U.S. states and territories by Gross Domestic Product (GDP). This article presents the 50 U.S. states and the District of Columbia and their nominal GDP at current prices.

The data source for the list is the Bureau of Economic Analysis (BEA) in 2021. The BEA defined GDP by state as "the sum of value added from all industries in the state."

Nominal GDP does not take into account differences in the cost of living in different countries, and the results can vary greatly from one year to another based on fluctuations in the exchange rates of the country's currency. Such fluctuations may change a country's ranking from one year to the next, even though they often make little or no difference in the standard of living of its population.

Overall, in the calendar year 2021, the United States' Nominal GDP at Current Prices totaled at $23.00 Trillion, as compared to $20.89 Trillion in 2020.

The three U.S. states with the highest GDPs were California ($3.36 Trillion), Texas ($2.1 Trillion), and New York ($2.0 Trillion). The three U.S. states with the lowest GDPs were Vermont ($36.1 Billion), Wyoming ($41.6 Billion), and Alaska ($55.0 Billion).

GDP per capita also varied widely throughout the United States in 2021, with New York ($93,463), Massachusetts ($91,130), and Washington state ($86,265) recording the three highest GDP per capita figures in the U.S., while Mississippi ($42,411), Arkansas ($47,770), and West Virginia ($49,017) recorded the three lowest GDP per capita figures in the U.S. The District of Columbia, though, recorded a GDP per capita figure far higher than any U.S. state in 2021 at $226,861.

50 states and the District of Columbia 

The table below lists the annual Nominal GDP of each U.S. state and the District of Columbia in 2022, as well as the GDP change and GDP per capita for that year. The list is initially sorted by Nominal GDP in 2021, but clicking the table headers can sort any column. The total for "United States" in this table excludes the U.S. territories.

The raw GDP data below is measured in Millions of U.S. Dollars

The GDP data below reflects the third-quarter 2022 GDP totals.

* indicates "GDP of STATE or FEDERAL DISTRICT" or "Economy of STATE or FEDERAL DISTRICT" links.

U.S. territories 
The Bureau of Economic Analysis (BEA) collects GDP data for four U.S. territories (American Samoa, Guam, the Northern Mariana Islands, and the U.S. Virgin Islands) separately from the states and the District of Columbia. Data for the U.S. territories is from the World Bank for GDP and GDP per capita, and from the Bureau of Economic Analysis for GDP growth (except Puerto Rico). All Puerto Rico data is from the World Bank. GDP data for the Northern Mariana Islands is from 2019, so it is listed separately.

Northern Mariana Islands
The Northern Mariana Islands GDP was $1.18 billion ($1,180 million) in 2019; GDP for the Northern Mariana Islands decreased by 11.2% in 2019; and GDP per capita in the Northern Mariana Islands was $20,659 in 2019.

See also 

 Economy of the United States
 List of states by adjusted per capita personal income
 List of U.S. states and territories by economic growth rate
 List of U.S. state economies
 List of cities by GDP
 List of U.S. metropolitan areas by GDP
 List of U.S. metropolitan areas by GDP per capita

References

External links 

States by GDP (nominal)
United States states by GDP (nominal)
Gdp
United States, GDP